Reily Lake (also known as Reiley Lake or Riley Lake) is an unincorporated community in Randolph County, Illinois, United States.

References

Unincorporated communities in Randolph County, Illinois
Unincorporated communities in Illinois
Illinois populated places on the Mississippi River